The Cadillac Three, originally known as The Cadillac Black, is an American rock band consisting of Jaren Johnston (lead vocals, guitar), Kelby Ray (lap steel guitar, bass guitar, vocals), and Neil Mason (drums, vocals). All three members were originally in the band American Bang. The group has released three albums through Big Machine Records, and has charted three singles on the Hot Country Songs and Country Airplay charts. In addition to their own work, Johnston has written singles for Keith Urban, Tim McGraw, Steven Tyler, Dallas Smith, and Jake Owen.

History
Before its foundation, all three members were in the group American Bang, which also featured Ben Brown as a fourth member; Mason and Brown had been in the band Llama before that. Between 2011 and 2013, Johnston co-wrote "You Gonna Fly" for Keith Urban, "Southern Girl" for Tim McGraw, and "Days of Gold" for Jake Owen, the last of which was also co-written by Mason.

The group released their debut self-titled album in 2012 (then titled The Cadillac Black).  In February 2013, the group signed to Big Machine Records and reissued their album. The album includes their own rendition of "Days of Gold".

In late 2013, the trio released its debut single, "The South." It features guest vocals from Florida Georgia Line, Dierks Bentley, and Eli Young Band lead singer Mike Eli. Billy Dukes of Taste of Country praised the song for its Southern rock influences. The song debuted at number 58 on the Country Airplay charts dated for the week ending December 21, 2013. On January 15, 2014, the group played their song on an episode of Nashville.

In 2015 the band played a show in America on the Friday, flew in from America to the UK to play Download Festival on the Saturday and ended up hitting the stage using fellow American band Black Stone Cherry's equipment as TC3's had not made it to the UK with them. Within hours of their set at Download they were heading back to America for a different festival appearance the following day. On April 23, 2015, the band played on Mane Stage in Long Beach, California.

The band's second album, Bury Me in My Boots, was released on August 5, 2016. It debuted at No. 5 on the Billboard Top Country Albums chart, selling 11,000 copies in the first week.

The band went on their first headlining US tour with Monster Energy Outbreak Presents from January 19 to March 17.

They released their third album, Legacy, on August 25, 2017.

They released their fourth album on February 7, 2020.

On October 23, 2020, the band released their fifth album Tabasco & Sweet Tea, via Big Machine Records.

On April 26, 2021, it was announced that the band would have their own radio show on Planet Rock (radio station) on every Saturday night throughout May 2021 called Garage Radio, which is in celebration of their 10th Anniversary as a band.

Discography

Studio albums

EPs

Singles

Songs
 "Days of Gold" (2013)

Music videos

Awards and nominations

References

American country rock groups
Country music groups from Tennessee
Rock music groups from Tennessee
Big Machine Records artists
Musical groups established in 2013
Musical groups from Nashville, Tennessee
American southern rock musical groups
2013 establishments in Tennessee